Pavel Kotsur (born 3 January 1974) is a chess player from Kazakhstan who holds the titles Grandmaster (1996) and FIDE Arbiter (2009).

He played for Kazakhstan in the Chess Olympiads of 1994, 1996, 1998, 2000, 2002 and 2008 and in the World Team Chess Championship of 1997. He took part in the FIDE World Chess Championship in 1999 (knocked out in the first round by Sergey Dolmatov), 2002 (knocked out in the first round by Leinier Domínguez) and 2004 (knocked out in the first round by Darmen Sadvakasov).

In 1999, Kotsur won the 4th stage of the Russia Cup in Novgorod. In 2002, he tied for first with Peter Kostenko in the Kazakhstani Chess Championship. In 2004 he tied for 4th–16th in the 3rd Aeroflot Open in Moscow.

In the March 2011 FIDE list, he has an Elo rating of 2562, making him Kazakhstan's number four.

References

External links
 
 

1974 births
Living people
Kazakhstani chess players
Chess grandmasters
Chess Olympiad competitors
Chess arbiters